The SU-122-44 was a Soviet self-propelled gun (SPG) designed in early 1944 with a   D-25S gun, with its fighting compartment situated at the front of the hull. The "44" in its name referred to the T-44 tank which the design was based on. The front had a sloped  armor plate, inclined at 27 degrees. The design was found to be too heavy for the chassis; its competitor, the SU-100-M-2, proved a superior design, and on March 7, 1945, all work on the SU-122-44 was terminated with no prototypes built.

See also
 Uralmash-1

References

Tracked self-propelled artillery
World War II self-propelled artillery
Uralmash products
World War II armoured fighting vehicles of the Soviet Union
Assault guns of the Soviet Union
122 mm artillery
Abandoned military projects of the Soviet Union